The 21 Division is a division of the Sri Lanka Army. Established on 4 April 1988 as 2nd Division, the division is currently based in Anuradhapura in the North Central Province. The division is a part of Security Forces Headquarters – Wanni and has three brigades and seven battalions. Brigadier H. R. K. P. Peiris has been commander of the division since 11 January 2013.

Organisation
The division is currently organised as follows:
 211 Brigade
 22nd Battalion, Gajaba Regiment (based in Pampeimadu, Northern Province)
 2nd Volunteer Battalion, Vijayabahu Infantry Regiment
 4th Volunteer Battalion, Sri Lanka Army Women's Corps (based in Medawachchiya, North Central Province)
 212 Brigade
 7th Volunteer Battalion, Sri Lanka Armoured Corps
 9th Volunteer Battalion, Corps of Engineer Services
 2nd Volunteer Battalion, Sri Lanka Army Women's Corps (based in Anuradhapura, North Central Province)
 213 Brigade
 24th Volunteer Battalion, Sri Lanka Light Infantry
 25th Battalion, Vijayabahu Infantry Regiment

References

1988 establishments in Sri Lanka
Military units and formations established in 1988
Organisations based in North Central Province, Sri Lanka
Sri Lanka Army divisions